Edmund Wright Brooks (29 September 1834 – 22 June 1928) was an English Quaker philanthropist and cement maker. He was active in the Anti-Slavery movement and also in famine relief in Russia and aid to Armenians. He was joint secretary and then chair of the Friends War Victims Relief Committee.

Family background
He was born 29 September 1834 at Melksham, in Wiltshire, of Quaker parents. He was the son of Edmund Brooks (1802–1893), baker, warehouseman, farmer and Ann Wright (1799?–1884), daughter of David Wright (1774?–1857) of Bury St Edmunds, baker, and Ann Wright (1778?–1827). He had two brothers. About 1850 the family moved to Esher, Surrey, where his father was a farmer.

Education
He was educated at the Sidcot School. He then entered the engineering works of John Fowler & Co., Leeds, and built up a solid position in the firm so that he was able to take a leading part in the engineering industry.

In 1860, he moved to Guildford in Surrey, where he practised as an engineer and in 1870, moved to Grays in Essex.

Business interests
In the cement business, he was a partner with his sons and sons-in-law in Hilton, Anderson Brooks, & Co earlier Brooks, Shoobridge and Co. with activities at Grays in Essex and Halling, Faversham and Upnor in Kent. At one time, his company employed the largest number of staff of any company in Essex. He was fully occupied with this business until the early 1890s, when he became more involved with Quaker and philanthropic work.

Quaker interests
He was treasurer the Anti-Slavery Society until his resignation in 1926. He was Secretary of the British Quaker Anti-Slavery Committee and was concerned among other things with the establishment in 1897 of a Mission in Pemba, one of the Zanzibar islands, now in Tanzania, to help freed and escaped slaves there.  Slavery was finally legally abolished in Zanzibar in 1909.

Because of his knowledge of Russian and his expertise, he was asked by the Meeting for Sufferings in November 1891 to go with Francis William Fox to Russia and investigate the reported famine there.  Brooks returned, reported on 15 January 1892 to the Meeting and left again with Herbert Sefton Jones, who was fluent in Russian, on 15 February with funds for a Quaker relief effort and an urgent need to distribute food before the spring thaw would make transportation difficult.  The Friends concentrated their efforts on Samara but also went to Tatarstan and other adjacent regions.  Some of the travel was by railway but much was by horse drawn sledge.  Brooks returned home on 12 April.  In the end, the Russian famine of 1891–92 killed between 375,000 and 500,000 people.

In 1895 he and Thomas William Marsh (1833–1902) waited on the Czar to plead the cause of religious dissenters in Russia, and he was later active on behalf of the Dukhobors when permission was secured for them to emigrate.  In 1899 he visited Leo Tolstoy with John Bellows.

Between 1896 and 1899, he was Clerk of the Friends Armenian Relief Committee, which raised £18,000.

He was a Joint Secretary, with Ruth Fry of Friends War Victims Relief Committee 1914–24, He was later chairman of its Executive Committee, and if needed, giving almost daily help to the small and overworked office staff. His son, Alfred, also served on this Committee.

Public service and politics
He had always been preoccupied with education.  At Guildford he had been secretary of the British School, and at Grays, he was a governor of Palmer's Endowed School and the first chairman of the Grays School Board. He also served on the Committee of Ackworth School, a Quaker school in Yorkshire.

He was involved in local government and philanthropic undertakings, and served as a JP for 30 years.

He stood for Parliament in the Essex, South East constituency, at the General Election of 1892 as a Gladstonian Liberal, against the sitting Conservative MP, Major F C Rasch.

He was a founder of Friends of Armenia which provided relief to Armenians, in 1897, and long term honorary treasurer.

Marriage, family and death

On 29 June 1859, he married Lucy Ann Marsh (1835–1926), daughter of Richard Marsh (1795–1878) of Strood, draper, and Ann Marsh (born Morris, 1793–1891).

There were four sons and six daughters, including Herbert Edmund Brooks (1860–1931), Alfred Brooks (1861–1952) and Howard Brooks (1868–1948), who succeeded him in the cement business. According to DQB and Digest Register at Friends House, the children were:
Herbert Edmund (born 18 May 1860, Kingston – died 1931)
Alfred (born 9 November 1861, Guildford – died 1952), grandfather of Anthony Brooks
Edith Annie (born 9 February 1863, Guildford – died 22 June 1890)
Charles (born 1 August 1864, Guildford – died 1948)
Lucy Ellen (born 3 September 1866, Guildford – died 1948)
Howard (born 8 May 1868, Guildford)
Ethel Mary (born 17 April 1870, Grays)
Mabel Winifred (born 11 November 1872, Grays)
Gertrude (born 12 February 1875, Grays)
Florence (born 22 March 1877, Grays)

He died at his home, 'Duval', Grays, 22 June 1928.

Of the nine surviving children, one resigned Quaker membership in 1886 and three more in 1915. His daughter Mabel Winifred (b. 1872) remained a Friend and married, in 1897, Henry Jeffrey Simpson (1868–1938) an employee and later partner in the family cement manufacturing company.

References

Sources
 Milligan's Biographical dictionary of British Quakers in commerce and industry: 
Edmund Brooks (1803?–1893) (father of Edward Wright Brooks) pp. 69–70, 
Edmund Wright Brooks p. 70 
Howard Brooks (1848–1948), son of Edmund Wright Brooks, p. 70.
 The Friend (1928), ns lxviii.635-7;
 Testimony of Ratcliff & Barking Monthly Meeting, in London Yearly Meeting Proceedings 1929 pp. 187–90.
 Barry Dackombe "The great Russian famine of 1891–2 : E.W. Brooks and Friends' famine relief "  In Journal of the Friends Historical Society, Vol.58 ; no.3 (1999) p. 277–299.
 Greenwood, John Ormerod Quaker Encounters; in three volumes;York, William Sessions
Volume 1: Friends and Relief (1975) 
Volume 2: Vines on the mountains (1977) 
Volume 3: Whispers of Truth (1978) 
Quaker Encounters Volume 1
86: E.W. Brooks speaks at Meeting for Sufferings concerning the massacre of Armenians in Turkey, he then persuades the Russian Government to instruct their ambassador in Turkey to assist a British Quaker fact-finding mission; 
87, Travels to Philippopolis (Bulgaria) to assist with refugees
104 note: visits to Russian Mennonites in 1895 with Thomas Marsh,  with his wife and Hannah White in 1896, with John Bellows in 1899.
108,  view of Tolstoy, following a visit to his home 8 April 1892
116, facing plate – drawing of E.W. Brooks, Francis W Fox and M Pobedonostzef in Russia concerning the famine, from the Daily Graphic 28 January 1892
117, facing plate – portrait photograph of E.W. Brooks
117, Tolstoy reports his own activity during the famine to E. W. Brooks.
120,123-4, Visit to Russia on behalf of the Quaker Russian Famine Committee, with F.W. Fox,  November 1891, 
122, 125, Visit to Russia with Herbert Jones in February 1892
127, Closing of Russian Famine fund
128-9, Secretary of Famine Relief Committee, Visits new Czar in 1895
135, E.W. Brooks on Committee to assist the Dukhobors in 1897
144, Efforts to see the Czar in 1900
165, Chair on the newly appointed War Victims Relief Committee, 1914
241, Quoted as having fore-echoed Ruth Fry's statement concerning the falsity of rumours of theft of relief food
Quaker Encounters Volume 2 – No index entries
Quaker Encounters Volume 3
167-8, Secretary of the Pemba Industrial Mission
 The Times, obituary of Edmund Wright Brooks on Sunday, 24 June 1928; pg. 19; Issue 44928; col B.

Notes

English Quakers
English businesspeople
Businesspeople in cement
People from Grays, Essex
People from Melksham
1834 births
1928 deaths